Circle of Friends is a 1995 film directed by Irish filmmaker Pat O'Connor, and based on the 1990 novel of the same name written by Maeve Binchy.

The movie was well received by critics and was a box office success.

Plot
Set in 1950s Ireland, the film relates the experiences of Bernadette "Benny" Hogan and her friends: Eve Malone and Nan Mahon. They are characterised during their First Communion: Benny is the beloved and well-fed only child of a tailor with a shop, Eve is the orphan reared by nuns and Nan is destined to be defined by her beauty. They grow up in the small town of Knockglen. Eight years later, Nan has moved to Dublin, and Benny and Eve have graduated from convent school and are heading to Dublin and university.

Eve's education is financed by the local landowning Westward Protestant family, who employed her father before his death. She has also been granted one of their estate cottages. She boards at a Dublin convent, while Benny commutes between home and Dublin, her parents being loath to lose her. They wish her to marry the creepy Sean Walsh, her father's employee, to secure the business's future.

In Dublin, the two girls reconnect with a mature, sophisticated Nan who is aware of her beauty. Benny falls for Jack Foley, a handsome rugby player and doctor's son studying medicine, though he is not convinced of this career. After the College Ball, they begin a relationship, Eve dates Aidan, a friend of Jack's, and Nan becomes involved with the older Simon Westward, heir to the estate. While Benny resists sex with Jack, Nan does not with Simon, believing he truly loves her.

When Benny's father dies, she suspends studies to care for her devastated mother and run the family shop. Sean attempts to woo her. Benny notices funds are missing and suspects Sean is involved but lacks proof.

Eve's cottage serves as a party location for the women. Nan and Simon visit it secretly. Nan becomes pregnant and tells Simon, sure he will marry her but Simon says he must marry for money to maintain the family estate. He offers her money for an abortion in England. A desperate Nan seeks Aidan, but runs into Jack, who has not seen Benny since her father's funeral. She convinces him to take her to a party and lures him into sex, later pretending that he got her pregnant. Jack is honourable and offers marriage. He tells Benny and she is devastated. Eve suspects someone is using the cottage after finding a half-burned newspaper. The convent nuns have told her they have seen lights and chimney smoke. Nan have suggested the cottage was haunted to conceal her secret meetings.

Eve throws another party, which a still devastated Benny attends. Nan, oblivious to the pain she has caused, convinces Jack they should attend, though he feels uneasy about it. Nan seeks out Eve, bringing her presents. An enraged Eve, having guessed Simon fathered Nan's baby, threatens to tell Jack the truth and comes towards Nan waving a bread knife. Nan falls into a glass door, severing an artery and so bleeding profusely. Jack comes to her aid. Benny, seeing them attending to Nan, leaves.

Jack tries to contact Benny but she refuses to answer. Though learning of Nan's deception, he escorts her to the harbour despite her protests that he has no responsibility. She asks for forgiveness and heads to England for her delivery (or an illegal abortion).

Curiosity over the fraud leads Benny to search Sean's living area. She finds pornographic pictures of fat women. Sean finds her there and attempts to sexually assault her. She fights him off, then finds the money he has embezzled. She demands he leave or she will call the Guards. Before leaving he slanders and demeans her and her entire family so thoroughly that Benny agrees that he must deserve the money after all. 

After Jack sees Nan off, he tries to win Benny back. He explains that aiding Nan made his hesitations over medicine disappear and that he loves her and never loved Nan. Benny tells him his actions have changed her and their relationship and they must take their time.

In a voiceover, Benny says Jack addressed his studies and pursued her, while she moved to Dublin to share a flat with Eve. A paper Benny writes causes a stir and points towards her career as a writer. In time, she falls in love with Jack again. The final scene shows her taking Jack to Eve's cottage. As he follows her inside, Benny says "Bless me father, for I have sinned," implying they have finally consummated their courtship.

Cast
 Chris O'Donnell as Jack Foley
 Minnie Driver as Bernadette "Benny" Hogan
 Saffron Burrows as Nan Mahon
 Alan Cumming as Sean Walsh
 Colin Firth as Simon Westward
 Geraldine O'Rawe as Eve Malone
 Aidan Gillen as Aidan Lynch
 Mick Lally as Dan Hogan
 Britta Smith as Mrs. Hogan
 Ciarán Hinds as Professor Flynn
 Tony Doyle as Dr. Foley
 Jason Barry as Nasey Mahon

Differences from the novel
 
There are several differences between the film script and the novel it is based on, the most notable being that Benny and Jack do not reunite at the end of the book. Other key differences include:

In the novel only Benny and Eve are childhood friends; they do not meet Nan (who was born and grew up in Dublin) until Benny's first day of university.
Several major characters from the novel do not appear in the film, notably Mother Francis (the Mother Superior who raises Eve as a daughter in the convent) and Kit Hegarty (Eve's landlady, whose son's death brings the principal characters together). 
Jack's switch from law to medicine does not happen in the novel.
Sean Walsh remains in Knockglen and marries the owner of the local hotel in the novel, a plot not featured in the film.
Benny does not confront Sean alone in the novel, and there is no scene of attempted sexual assault.
Clodagh Pine and Alphonse “Fonsie” (no last name given) are niece and nephew of two Knockglen merchants whom Benny befriends in the novel, but don’t appear in the film. They are both trying to update the family businesses.

Reception
Circle of Friends was positively received by critics, as the film holds a 78% rating on Rotten Tomatoes based on 36 reviews.

References

External links
 
 
 
 Circle of Friends at Shot at Trinity (database of films shot at Trinity College Dublin)

1995 films
1995 drama films
English-language Irish films
Irish drama films
Films directed by Pat O'Connor
Films based on Irish novels
Films scored by Michael Kamen
Savoy Pictures films
Films set in Dublin (city)
1990s English-language films
1990s female buddy films